Jecheon station is a railway station in the city of Jecheon. It is on the Jungang Line and the Taebaek Line. This station is also served by all Chungbuk Line passenger services.

History
1 September 1941: station opened on Gyeonggyeong Line
31 December 1955: Taebaek Line opened
31 December 1958: Chungbuk Line passenger service started
30 June 1973: tracks between Cheongnyangni and Jecheon are electrified 
20 June 1978: tracks between Jecheon and Gohan are electrified
December 1987: tracks between Jecheon and Dodam are electrified
1 November 1988: Saemaeul Express service started
31 March 2011: electrified double track opened between Jecheon and Dodam
5 January 2021: Korea Train Express service started

References

External links
 Cyber station information from Korail

Railway stations in North Chungcheong Province
Jecheon
Railway stations opened in 1941